Shortcake generally refers to a dessert with a crumbly scone like texture. There are multiple variations of shortcake most of which are usually served with fruit and cream, one of the most popular being strawberry shortcake which is typically served with whipped cream. Other variations common in the UK are Blackberry & clotted cream shortcake, and Lemon Berry Shortcake, which is served with lemon curd in place of cream.

Preparation
Shortcake is typically made with flour, sugar, baking powder or soda, salt, butter, milk or cream, and sometimes eggs. The dry ingredients are blended, and then the butter is cut in until the mixture resembles cornmeal. The liquid ingredients are then mixed in just until moistened, resulting in a shortened dough. The dough is then dropped in spoonfuls onto a baking sheet, rolled and cut like baking powder biscuits, or poured into a cake pan, depending on how wet the dough is and the baker's preferences.  Then it is baked at a relatively high temperature until set.

Strawberry shortcake is a widely known dessert made with shortcake. Sliced strawberries are mixed with sugar and allowed to sit an hour or so, until the strawberries have surrendered a great deal of their juices (macerated). The shortcakes are split and the bottoms are covered with a layer of strawberries, juice, and whipped cream, typically flavored with sugar and vanilla. The top is replaced, and more strawberries and whipped cream are added onto the top. Some convenience versions of shortcake are not made with a shortcake (i.e. biscuit) at all, but instead use a base of sponge cake or sometimes a corn muffin.

Though strawberry is the most widely known shortcake dessert, peach shortcake, blueberry shortcake, chocolate shortcake and other similar desserts are made along similar lines.  In some recipes the shortcake itself is flavored; coconut is one addition.

History
The "short" part of the name "shortcake" indicates something crumbly or crispy, generally through the addition of a fat such as butter or lard. The earliest mention of the term shortcake occurred in 1588,  in the second English cookbook to be printed, The Good Huswifes Handmaid for Cookerie in her Kitchen (London, 1588). It describes a cookie or biscuit in the English sense, made of flour, cream, sugar, egg yolk and spices.

Strawberries were first included in a recipe for "Strawberry cake" which appeared in the June 1, 1845 issue (page 86) of The Ohio Cultivator (Columbus). The recipe was popularized by Eliza Leslie of Philadelphia, Pennsylvania in The lady's receipt-book (1847). These "Strawberry cakes" were made of a thick unleavened cookie of flour, butter, eggs and sugar, split, layered with fresh strawberries, and covered with a hard sugar-and-egg white icing.  

The North American introduction of baking soda and baking powder as leaven in the 1800s revolutionized baking and made possible the   biscuit-style shortcake. By the 1850s, leavened shortcakes were   the popular pastry for American strawberry cakes, and the term strawberry shortcake became established. 

By the 1860s, cream was being poured onto the shortcake and strawberries. A June 1862 issue of the Genesse Farmer (Rochester) described a “Strawberry Shortcake” made up of layers of soda biscuit, fresh berries, sugar, and cream.  A similar recipe appeared in Jennie June's American Cookery Book (1866) by Jane Cunningham Croly. The first known cookbook by a black woman in the United States, A domestic cook book (1866) by Malinda Russell, also contains a recipe.

Festivals 
In the United States, strawberry shortcake parties were held as celebrations of the summer fruit harvest. This tradition is upheld in some parts of the United States on June 14, which is Strawberry Shortcake Day.

Record
The largest strawberry shortcake ever made was in the town of La Trinidad, Benguet in the Philippines on March 20, 2004. It weighed 21,213.40 lb (9622.23 kg.)

See also

 List of cakes
 List of quick breads
 List of strawberry dishes
 Strawberry cake
Strawberry Shortcake, an American Greetings character who bears the name of, and is based on, the dessert
Joanie Cunningham, a Happy Days character nicknamed “Shortcake”

References

British desserts
Quick breads
Sweet breads
Strawberry dishes
American cakes
Biscuits
Pastries